Zagrosjet was an airline headquartered in Erbil, capital of the autonomous region of Kurdistan Region, which operated scheduled and chartered international passenger and cargo flights. The airline suspended all flight operations due to blockade on Erbil airport post Kurdistan referendum period.

History 

The Airline takes its name from the Zagros Mountains. Zagrosjet was established in October 2005 by Zagros Group under the name Zagros Air. It was licensed as an Air Carrier by Ministry of Transportation – Iraq in June 2013 to perform scheduled and unscheduled flights for passenger and cargo. In August 2013 the airline changed its name to Zagrosjet to avoid confusion with Zagros Airlines of Iran. Zagrosjet launched its flight operations in 2013 with a network covering Middle East destinations, Europe and Turkey.

Destinations
As of February 2016 Zagrosjet offers scheduled flights to the following destinations:

Fleet
Zagrosjet operated the following aircraft during operations (as of July 2021):

References

External links

Official website

Defunct airlines of Iraq
Airlines established in 2005
Airlines disestablished in 2018
Erbil
Iraqi companies established in 2005
2018 disestablishments in Iraq